() is the third studio album by Swedish singer Benjamin Ingrosso, released on 16 April 2021 by TEN Music Group. The album is a follow-up to Ingrosso's second studio album En gång i tiden (del 1), released on 15 January 2021. On the day of the album's release, Ingrosso gave a live performance of the single "Allt det vackra" on TV4's Efter fem, accompanied by Gustav Jonsson, one of the album's producers, and Viktor Olsén.

The album debuted at number one on the Swedish national albums chart published by the Swedish Recording Industry Association.

Critical reception 

Reviewing the album for Aftonbladet, Markus Larsson wrote that there is a "warm and melancholy late summer feeling over the music" and found "Allt det vackra" and "Det stora röda huset" to be "among the best [songs] that Ingrosso has done so far". Although feeling that the album as a whole is "uneven", Larsson considered Ingrosso to be further laying "the foundation for a broad and varied career". Scandipop called En gång i tiden (del 2) "an essential album to take in, enjoy, and keep returning to in its entirety."

Track listing 

Notes
"Ouvertyr" contains elements of "Längst inne i mitt huvud", "Känns som att livet börjar hända", "Flickan på min gata", "Långsamt farväl" from Ingrosso's previous album En gång i tiden (del 1) and "Judy min vän".

Charts

Weekly charts

Year-end charts

Certifications

References

2021 albums
Benjamin Ingrosso albums
Pop albums by Swedish artists
Sequel albums
Swedish-language albums
TEN Music Group albums